The Irish Singles Chart is a record chart compiled by Chart-Track on behalf of the Irish Recorded Music Association. The chart week runs from Friday to Thursday.

See also
 List of number-one albums of 2012 (Ireland)

References

Number-one singles
Ireland
2012